Quasar is the name of several fictional superheroes appearing in American comic books published by Marvel Comics. They are noted for having worn the Quantum Bands, advanced ancient alien technology that grants the wearer manipulation of quantum energy.

Fictional character biography

Wendell Vaughn

Vaughn is the longest-running Quasar character, and the first to use the name.

Phyla-Vell

Phyla-Vell becomes Quasar for a time after taking the Quantum Bands from Annihilus.

Richard Rider

To keep him from dying while deprived of the Nova Force, Rider temporarily takes the Quantum Bands from Vaughn, thus becoming Quasar.

Avril Kincaid
Avril Kincaid is a S.H.I.E.L.D. agent who debuted during the Avengers: Standoff! storyline. While working at Pleasant Hill, a gated community holding super villains brainwashed by Kobik, Avril runs a daycare center as her cover. When Baron Helmut Zemo and Fixer regain their memories and start a riot, Kincaid is attacked by the Blood Brothers, but is saved by Captain America and Winter Soldier. After Captain America shuts down the security system at the Pleasant Hill Museum, Kincaid enters it and encounters the curator, a retired Wendell Vaughn. As part of a contingency plan for if S.H.I.E.L.D. ever lost control of Kobik, Vaughn gives the Quantum Bands to Kincaid. In the aftermath of the events that transpired at Pleasant Hill, Kincaid becomes the new Quasar with Vaughn acting as her mentor. She is later revealed to be gay.

She is later seen trying to prevent an attack by the Chitauri, but is apparently killed in action. Her apparent death leads the United States government to give Captain America control of the military and law enforcement, as Steve Rogers also assumes control of Hydra. It is later revealed that Kincaid is in a comatose state. When she awakens, she destroys the planetary shield that the Hydra Steve Rogers has been using to keep some of Earth's most powerful heroes off-planet. However, this act seemingly costs Avril her life, with Captain Marvel stating that Avril died after bringing down the shield.

After Avril's apparent demise, Wendell Vaughn reassumes the Quasar mantle. However, after becoming trapped in a black hole, Vaughn catches a glimpse of Avril, who is still alive, but lost somewhere in space.

Powers and abilities

The Quasars' powers are derived from the pair of Quantum Bands fused to the bearer's wrists (or more specifically, from the seven gems on each of the bands). The bands are permanently affixed to the wrists; while he or she can make light bend around them so they appear to be invisible, they are still tangible. They are linked to their wearer's nervous system and grant tremendous powers of energy manipulation, apparently working the same for each bearer. Composed of unknown materials, the bands were originally created by Eon to be worn by his designated Protector of the Universe. At some point they were left in a weapons depot by the alien Kree, where they were discovered by the Uranian Eternals and brought to Earth by the deluded Crusader, who believed himself to be the 1950s Marvel Boy.

Foremost among the bands' powers is the ability to tap into a limitless energy source called the "Quantum Zone". Quasars can project quantum energy in the form of devastating beams of force or heat. Vaughn more commonly employs them to fashion incredibly durable constructs of solid energy, such as containment spheres or pincers. He protects himself with a personal force field of quantum energy.

The Quantum Bands can also exert control over many other types of energy that are part of the electromagnetic spectrum. For example, Vaughn once caused a star to emit an enormous solar flare. It is also possible to absorb and redirect the cosmic energy wielded by such powerful beings as the Silver Surfer, Jack of Hearts, Adam Warlock, Thanos, Jean Grey and the Watchers, siphoning their power and using it to augment the quantum energy. Forms of energy the Quantum Bands cannot control include magic and the Darkforce.

Although the bands apparently cannot overtly affect psionic energy, Vaughn has programmed them to render him impervious to psionic mental control. Even such powerful psychics as Moondragon and the Overmind have proven unable to overcome this defense. This does not protect the bearer from magical forms of compulsion.

It is possible to create apertures into and out of the Quantum Zone, thus allowing passage through its infinite, featureless expanse. Vaughn mainly uses this ability to traverse interstellar distances in a manner similar to hyperspace travel, which he refers to as a "Quantum Jump". A Quantum Jump has a destructive side effect on the local environment, violently upheaving gravity and tearing holes in the atmosphere (on Earth, it would damage the ozone layer). Vaughn initially refrains from using this ability except when in space or in dire circumstances, but eventually discovers that he can prevent this effect by surrounding himself with a barrier of solid energy before jumping. It is also possible to shunt matter into the Quantum Zone, provided that the Quasar is in physical contact with it.

The Quantum Bands enable their wearer to fly by manipulating gravitons. The maximum obtainable flight speed is unknown, but Vaughn once made a trip from Earth to Uranus in approximately four years flying non-stop (this was before he learned how to quantum jump). This doesn't take into account the velocity that can be achieved in a short burst of acceleration.

The Quantum Bands' gems possess some capability to analyze and process information as if they were extremely advanced computers. This makes it possible to navigate the Quantum Zone and the depths of space. The gems are able to detect, analyze, and track energy emissions across vast distances. They can also "program" Quasars' quantum energy to register and react to certain preset conditions. For instance, at one time Vaughn had the Earth surrounded with an invisible lattice-work of energy that was designed to act as a global alert system against potential extraterrestrial threats. The energy field could detect any surges of exotic energy emanating from the planet's surface and any object larger than a micrometeorite passing through it; in either case, the field would react by transmitting an alert signal to the Quantum Bands.

Vaughn has had a direct link to Eon and later Epoch through the bands, which provides ready access to their omniscience.

Phyla-Vell discovers that the bands contain a finite amount of energy which will drain away if they are isolated from their power source (as yet unexplained) and that they also remain linked in some way to their former users.

Other versions

In other media

Television
 The Phyla-Vell incarnation of Quasar appeared on The Avengers: Earth's Mightiest Heroes episode "Michael Korvac" as a member of the Guardians of the Galaxy, voiced by Moira Quirk.
 Phyla-Vell appears in the third season of the Guardians of the Galaxy animated series, voiced by Ming-Na Wen. This version is a Kree accuser.

Video games
 The Wendell Vaughn incarnation of Quasar appears in the 2016 video game Lego Marvel's Avengers.
 The Avril Kincaid incarnation of Quasar is a playable character in the 2015 video game Marvel: Future Fight.

Footnotes

References
 Grand Comics Database
 Unofficial Handbook of Marvel Comics Creators
 Comics Vine

External links
 Quasar (disambiguation) at the Marvel Universe
 Quasar at Marvel Wikia
 

1994 comics endings
Comics characters introduced in 1979
Fictional characters with density control abilities
Marvel Comics characters who can teleport
S.H.I.E.L.D. agents
Articles about multiple fictional characters